Spy is the eighth studio album by American singer-songwriter Carly Simon, released by Elektra Records, on June 30, 1979. 

The title of the album is a tribute to Anaïs Nin, whose quote "I am an international spy in the house of love", is written across the top on the inside jacket. Simon dedicated the album to producer Arif Mardin, in which she wrote in the liner notes, "Dedicated to Arif who is himself fantastic." It is also Simon's last album for Elektra Records, she signed with Warner Bros. Records and released Come Upstairs the following year.

Reception

Debra Rae Cohen, writing in Rolling Stone, stated "Here, Simon’s rough, bold voice — powerful and affecting as ever — seizes center stage with husky promise and, like a dormitory storyteller after lights out, threatens revelations. But even discounting the mediating layers of studio polish, she winds up sounding strangely distanced from her material." She also singled out the track "We're So Close", calling it "the record’s gem".

Although Spy did not yield any major hit singles, "Vengeance" (which features actor Tim Curry on backing vocals) earned Simon a Grammy Award nomination for Best Rock Vocal Performance, Female in early 1980, the first year to feature this new category. Cash Box said that it has "an urban rock feeling, with ominous guitar chording and touches of syndrums," saying that "Simon's vocals are...sharp and bold" but "less restrained than usual." The song peaked at No. 48 on the Billboard Pop singles chart, and No. 52 on the Cash Box top singles chart. She included the track on her two-disc career compilation set Anthology (2002), as well as the three-disc special edition compilation Carly Simon Collector's Edition (2009). Simon made a music video for the song, and she became the second female solo artist to be featured on MTV's first day of the air. MTV later used a clip from the video in a commercial to entice viewers to get stereo sound on their Television sets. The promotional clip was also chosen by Pioneer Electronics to be part of their first demo disc for its then-new LaserDisc player.

The title song was released as the second single from the album, and it reached No. 34 on the Billboard Adult Contemporary chart. The album also features the songs "Never Been Gone" and "We're So Close", which have become fan favorites and stand among Simon's personal favorites of her own songs. In 2009, Simon released Never Been Gone; an album which includes a newly recorded version of the song, along with some of her other greatest hits.

Awards

Track listing
Credits adapted from the album's liner notes.

Personnel

Musicians

Production

Charts
Album – Billboard (United States)

Album – International

Singles – Billboard (United States)

References

External links
Carly Simon's Official Website

1979 albums
Carly Simon albums
Elektra Records albums
Albums produced by Arif Mardin